The 2018 season was Strømsgodset's twelfth season back in Eliteserien since their promotion in the 2006 season.

Squad

Out on loan

Transfers

Winter

In:

 

Out:

Summer

In:

 
 

Out:

Competitions

Eliteserien

Results summary

Results by round

Results

Table

Norwegian Cup

Final

Squad statistics

Appearances and goals

|-
|colspan="14"|Players away from Strømsgodset on loan:

|-
|colspan="14"|Players who left Strømsgodset during the season:

|}

Goal scorers

Disciplinary record

References

Strømsgodset Toppfotball seasons
Stromsgodset